Desmia albitarsalis is a moth in the family Crambidae. It is found in Venezuela.

References

Moths described in 1917
Desmia
Moths of South America